John Mein (b. Edinburgh, Scotland; d. London, England) was a Boston, Massachusetts, bookseller and publisher in the time before the American Revolution. Mein started Boston's first circulating library, and with his business partner, John Fleeming, Mein published the Loyalist newspaper, the Boston Chronicle, the first semi-weekly in New England.

Early years
Mein, son of John Mein, was born in Edinburgh where he received a good education before entering the bookselling business. In 1754, he apprenticed to Edinburgh bookseller, John Trail, and in 1760, he became Burgess and Guild Brother of Edinburgh.  In 1761, Mein advertised a variety of children's books, and in November 1763, he announced that he would give up his business the following year.

Career
Mein emigrated to Boston in October 1764 with a large quantity of books and linens. With Robert Sandeman (nephew of Robert Sandeman the theologian), Mein opened a store advertising English and Scottish prayer books, and beer from Edinburgh. Within the year, Mein dissolved the partnership with Sandeman.

Mein then opened his own bookstore that he named The London Bookstore, and began the first circulating library in Boston.  His catalog advertised twelve hundred books, and he offered various payment schedules: "One Pound, Eight Shillings, lawful Mondey, per Year; Eighteen Shillings per Half-Year; or Ten and Eight Pence per Quarter." He sold the catalog for a shilling, and restricted loans to one book at a time. The library collection included works of history, literature, travel, law, medicine, and the like, in English and French, by authors such as:

 Joseph Addison
 Aesop
 Nathan Bailey
 Jane Barker
 Gilles Augustin Bazin
 Aphra Behn
 Robert Beverly
 William Biggs
 Thomas Blacklock
 Humphrey Bland
 Giovanni Boccaccio
 Jacques-Bénigne Bossuet
 Henry Brooke (writer)
 George Buchanan
 Edmund Burke
 Gilbert Burnet
 Thomas Burnet
 John Campbell (author)
 Miguel de Cervantes
 Pierre François Xavier de Charlevoix
 François de Chassepol
 William Rufus Chetwood
 John Cleland
 Mary Collyer
 William Congreve
 Claude Prosper Jolyot de Crébillon
 Campbell Dalrymple
 Daniel Defoe
 Pierre Desfontaines
 W.H. Dilworth
 Robert Dossie
 Jacques Du Bosc
 Jean-Baptiste Du Halde
 Thomas Dyche
 François-Ignace Espiard de la Borde
 George Farquhar
 François Fénelon
 Daniel Fenning
 Henry Fielding
 Samuel Foote
 Antoine-Yves Goguet
 Hannah Glasse
 Sarah Harrison
 Eliza Haywood
 Aaron Hill (writer)
 John Hill (author)
 Nathaniel Hooke
 David Hume
 Mary Johnson
 Samuel Johnson
 Charles Johnstone
 Jorge Juan y Santacilia
 Basil Kennett
 John Knox
 Alain-René Lesage
 Roger L'Estrange
 Edmund Ludlow
 George Lyttelton, 1st Baron Lyttelton
 Philippe Macquer
 Giovanni Paolo Marana
 Jean-François Marmontel
 John Milton
 Molière
 Mary Wortley Montagu
 Montesquieu
 Edward Moore (dramatist)
 Charles Morrell
 Frederik Ludvig Norden
 Thomas Otway
 Eliza Parsons
 Alexander Pope
 John Potter (archbishop)
 Richard Rawlinson
 Samuel Richardson
 William Robertson (historian)
 Charles Rollin
 Jean de la Roque
 Jean-Jacques Rousseau
 Nicholas Rowe (writer)
 Henry Saxby
 Marie de Rabutin-Chantal, marquise de Sévigné
 William Shakespeare
 John Shebbeare
 Frances Sheridan
 Algernon Sidney
 Tobias Smollett
 Antonio de Solís y Ribadeneyra
 Maximilien de Béthune, Duke of Sully
 Jonathan Swift
 Antonio de Ulloa
 Miguel Venegas
 Réné-Aubert Vertot
 Voltaire
 Joseph Warton
 John Wright
Periodicals
 The Adventurer
 American Magazine and Historical Chronicle
 Annual Register
 The Connoisseur (newspaper)
 The Critical Review
 The Guardian (1713)
 Herald, or Patriot Proclaimer
 The London Magazine
 The Rambler
 The Spectator (1711)
 Tatler (1709)
 The World

In December 1767, to increase business, Mein started up The Boston Chronicle with Fleeming. Fleeming (or Fleming), the other partner in the firm, Mein and Fleeming, was also a "Scotchman".  They also printed several books and almanacks, including the almanac Mein and Fleeming's register for New-England and Nova Scotia.

The Boston Chronicle was a Tory paper and began by publishing articles from London critical of William Pitt who was the Whig’s hero.  The Boston Gazette responded with a letter (01/18/1768) probably written by James Otis attacking the views of the Chronicle. Mein visited the office of the Gazette (01/25/1768) demanding to know who wrote the article. Benjamin Edes would not reveal the source of the letter.  A day later Mein ran into Edes on the street and attacked him. James Otis representing Edes won an award of £70.
Opposed to boycotting goods subject to stamp duties, Mein wrote in the Chronicle in support of the colonial policy of the British government including, in 1769, lists of names that accused colonial merchants of breaking a British nonimportation agreement. In retaliation, Mein's name appeared on a list of merchants who violated the trade agreement. Mein responded by publishing another letter, this time accusing the Merchants' Committee of using the nonimportation agreement for illegal profiteering. The irritated public ransacked the Chronicle and Mein's office in October 1769.  In the scuffle, Mein shot a grenadier. He sought safety on a ship in the harbor which sailed for Great Britain a few days later.

Previously in July 1769 Thomas Longman a supplier of books to both Mein and John Hancock wrote the latter for a suggestion of a representative in Boston who would represent him in his attempts to obtain payment for books owed to him by Mein. Hancock seeing this as a golden opportunity offered himself. In October while Mein was travelling east to London, the Power of Attorney was travelling west to John Hancock.

Mein left New England 2000 pounds in debt. Upon reaching England, he made contact with Lord Dartmouth and gave his perspective of affairs in colonial Massachusetts. Thereafter, Mein spent a year in King's Bench Prison. Upon release, he wrote against the patriot movement in various London newspapers.

He returned to Boston where he was convicted for failing to meet his financial obligations, with no mention of the grenadier. He made an attempt at re-establishing his bookseller and library business with limited success.  After spending some time in Boston's prison, Mein returned to England.

The Boston Chronicle was being operated by Mein’s partner John Fleeming and had stopped publishing the attacks on the patriots. In March, 1770 John Hancock represented by John Adams was granted an attachment of £2000.  The Sheriff subsequently accepted the pledges of Mein’s friends and the Chronicle stayed in business.

Finally in September 1770 Mein, unable to come to terms with his creditors realized he had lost. In November the Inferior Court ruled against him and the Supreme Court ruled against his appeal. John Hancock disposed of all of his assets but the creditors still received only 50% of what they were owed. John Hancock however had a great victory as he had destroyed a critic while undermining freedom of the press.

Personal life
Mein was friends with Nathaniel Coffin, a surveyor and political figure in Lower Canada and a militia officer in Upper Canada.  Mein belonged to the Scots Charitable Society of Boston. He died in London.

Partial works
 1765, A catalogue of Mein's circulating library, consisting of above twelve hundred volumes, in most branches of polite literature, arts and sciences; viz. history, voyages, travels, lives ... &c. ...
 1767, Boston, October 22d, 1767 : Proposals for printing a new weekly paper, called the Boston chronicle. ... Subscriptions are taken in by John Mein at the London Book-Store, north side of King-Street.
 1767, Table of the kings and queens, from the conquest of the Heptarchy, A.D. 821. (which was united in 828) by Egbert, King of the West-Saxons, and first monarch of all England.
 1767, Bickerstaff's Boston almanack, for the year of our Lord 1768 ... : Calculated for the meridian of Boston; but will answer without a sensible error for any part of New-England. : Illustrated with an elegant plate of the giants lately discovered in South America ...
 1769, A state of the importations from Great-Britain into the port of Boston, from the beginning of Jan. 1769, to Aug. 17th 1769. : With the advertisements of a set of men who assumed to themselves the title of "All the well disposed merchants," who entered into a solemn agreement, (as they called it) not to import goods from Britain, and who undertook to give a "true account" of what should be imported by other persons. : The whole taken from the Boston chronicle, in which the following papers were first published.
 1770, A state of importations from Great-Britain into the port of Boston. From the beginning of January 1770. To which is added an account of all goods that have been re-shipt from the above port for Great-Britain since January 1769.
 1775, Sagittarius's letters and political speculations extracted from the Public ledger. Humbly inscribed to the very loyal and truly pious Doctor Samuel Cooper, pastor of the Congregational church in Brattle street.

See also
 Early American publishers and printers
 Bibliography of early American publishers and printers

References

Further reading

 Charles K. Bolton. "Circulating libraries in Boston, 1765-1865", Publications of the Colonial Society of Massachusetts, Volume 11, Feb. 1907, p. 196+
 Colin Nicolson. "A Plan 'To Banish All the Scotchmen': Victimization and Political Mobilization in Pre-Revolutionary Boston." Massachusetts Historical Review, Vol. 9 (2007), pp. 55–102.

American booksellers
American newspaper publishers (people)
People from colonial Boston
Publishers (people) from Edinburgh
Scottish booksellers
Year of birth unknown
Year of death unknown
People imprisoned for debt
Scottish expatriates in the United States
Burgesses in Scotland
18th-century American businesspeople